Maurie Wasi (born 6 December 1982, in Auckland) is a Papua New Guinean footballer who is a coach at western springs football club

External links
 Player stats - NZFC Maurie plays at birkenhead united first team

1982 births
Living people
Papua New Guinean footballers
Papua New Guinea international footballers
Papua New Guinean expatriate footballers
Association football forwards
Waikato FC players
Expatriate association footballers in New Zealand
Association footballers from Auckland
Papua New Guinean expatriate sportspeople in New Zealand
2012 OFC Nations Cup players
Birkenhead United AFC players